Pachyaena (literally, "thick hyena") was a genus of heavily built, relatively short-legged mesonychids, early Cenozoic mammals that evolved before the origin of either modern hoofed animals or carnivores, and combined characteristics similar to both. The genus likely originated from Asia and spread to Europe, and from there to North America across a land bridge in what is now the North Atlantic ocean. Various described species of Pachyaena ranged in size from a coyote to a bear. However, recent work indicates that Pachyaena is paraphyletic, with P. ossifraga being closer to Synoplotherium, Harpagolestes and Mesonyx than to P. gigantea.  
 
Unlike many mesonychids, Pachyaena is known from skeletal material in addition to skulls and jaws. Analysis of three wolf- to bear-sized species from the early Eocene of Wyoming (Willwood formation) indicates they all had many adaptations for running, including paraxonic compressed feet with a vestigial first digit, lower sections of the limbs elongated compared with the upper sections, and limb joints with movement mostly restricted to a sagittal plane (back-and-forth movement). All these characteristics are common to both ungulates that run to escape predators and carnivores that run to pursue prey, though they probably evolved independently in mesonychids. Some adaptations are more typical of the grade of cursorial carnivores; others are more specialized, as in ungulates. Pachyaena was likely built for endurance rather than speed; the overall body shape of the genus would have resembled a modern tapir.

Size varied depending on the species: For P. gracilis, the body mass estimated based in femur length is 24.0 kg, for P. ossifraga is about 56.9 kg, and for the large P. gigantea is 81.7 kg. However, weight estimations of P. gigantea vary from 129 to 396 kg.

Species
The genus' greatest diversity is seen in North America, with P. ossifraga known from Latest Paleocene strata of Wyoming, and P. gigantea, P. intermedia, and P. gracilis known from Early Eocene strata of Wyoming. P. nemegetica is known from Late Paleocene strata of Mongolia.

References

Paleogene mammals of North America
Mesonychids
Paleocene mammals
Eocene mammals
Eocene genus extinctions
Paleogene mammals of Asia
Fossil taxa described in 1874
Prehistoric placental genera